Shikaripura Assembly constituency is one of the 224 assembly constituencies of Karnataka, a state in Southern India. It is named after the town of Shikaripur, which forms part of the constituency. It is one of the 8 vidhan sabha constituencies which form Shimoga Lok Sabha Constituency.

Members of Legislative Assembly

Election results

2018 Vidhan Sabha

2014 By-poll

2013 Vidhan Sabha

2008 Vidhan Sabha

1999 Vidhan Sabha
 Mahalingappa (INC) : 55,852 votes 
 B.S.Yediyurappa (BJP) : 48,291

References

 
 

Shikaripur
Assembly constituencies of Karnataka